Lieutenant-General Henry George Hart (1808–1878) was a British Army officer who was best known as the author, editor, and proprietor of Hart's Army List, an unofficial publication recording army service.

Early life
Born on 7 September 1808 in Glencree, Ireland, Henry was the third son of Lieutenant colonel William Hart who served in both the Royal Navy and British Army before emigrating to the Cape of Good Hope in 1819 where he died in 1848. Henry accompanied his father to the Cape, and on 1 April 1829 he was appointed ensign in the 49th Foot, then stationed there. Henry's mother Jane Matson (1779-1861) was the second daughter of Charles Matson (1750-1828) of Wingham, Kent.

Military career
The 49th foot's regimental history suggests that Henry would soon have joined the rest of his regiment in India until 6 April 1840 when they embarked upon transport ships bound for China. During the remainder of 1840 to the end of 1842, the regiment took part in the First Opium War where they were engaged in the battles of Canton, Amoy, Chusan, Chinhai, Chapu and the Heights of Chinkiang.

After China the regiment returned to England but was later deployed to Ireland in 1845. As a regimental officer, Hart was a poor law inspector in Ireland during the famine of 1845–6. In 1856, when in temporary command of the depot battalion at Templemore, he suppressed a mutiny of the North Tipperary militia, defending the town of Nenagh.

The dates of his commissions were: 
Lieutenant – 19 July 1832
Captain – 1 December 1842
Major – 15 December 1848
Lieutenant-colonel – 30 May 1856
Colonel – 27 December 1860
Major-general – 6 March 1868
Lieutenant-general – 4 December 1877.

Death
He died at Biarritz, in France on 24 March 1878. Buried at Boulogne-sur-Mer, in France, in a grave contiguous to that of his wife and under the same granite obelisk.

Hart's Army List
When Hart joined the army, the main reference work was John Philippart's Royal Military Calendar of 1820. Hart supplemented information in the official army lists, using interleaved copies. In February 1839, supported by his wife and with the approval of the military authorities, Hart published the first edition of his Quarterly Army List, which was well received.

Hart was allowed access to the official records of officers' services, and in 1840 published his first Annual Army List, containing supplementary information in addition to the contents of the Quarterly. The role of editor was later taken over by his son Fitzroy. The List was published until 1915.

Family
At the Reformed Church, Cape of Good Hope, in South Africa, 7 January 1833, Hart married Frances Alicia Okes (1809-1874), 4th daughter of the Reverend Holt Okes, D.D. Chaplain of Wynberg 1832–1852. 

Their family of nine children included three surviving sons, who all served with distinction in the army: 
Jane Margaret Hart (1834-1896) married 14 August 1862, at St. Mark's, Surbiton, in Surrey, James Curtis Leman (1834-1897) solicitor
Henry Travers Holt Hart (1836-1841)
Holt William Hart (1838-1850)
Frances Alicia Hart (1840-1923) married 23 April 1867, at Boulogne-sur-Mer, in France, Edward Coventry (1843-1914) corn factor
George Okes Hart (1842-1851)
Major General Arthur Fitzroy Hart Synnot (1844-1910), C.B., 1st battalion East Surrey Regiment, married 22 December 1868, at Boulogne-sur-Mer, in France, Mary Susannah (May) Synnot (1844-1913), eldest daughter of Mark Seton Synnot of Ballymoyer House, County Armagh
Isabel Clara Hart (1846-1929), married 22 July 1868, at Boulogne-sur-Mer, in France, Lieutenant-Colonel Francis Mackenzie Salmond (1841-1900)
General Sir Reginald Clare Hart (1848-1931), V.C., Royal Engineers. Married 6 August 1872, at Omeath Church, in County Louth, Charlotte Augusta Synnot (1854-1936) 5th daughter of Mark Seton Synnot of Ballymoyer House, County Armagh
Colonel Horatio Holt Hart (1850-1915), Royal Engineers Married firstly 8 August 1872, at Paris, in France, Emily Aline Clements (1855-1902). Married secondly 2 April 1903, at Mussoorie, in Bengal, India, Alice Maud Goudall (1863-1950)

Notes

Attribution

1808 births
1878 deaths
British Army lieutenant generals
British book editors
49th Regiment of Foot officers